Merano-Maia Bassa/Meran-Untermais is a railway station in the southwestern part of the town of Merano/Meran in South Tyrol, northern Italy. The station is on the Bolzano/Bozen to Merano/Meran line between the stations of Lana-Postal/Lana-Burgstal and Merano/Meran. It has two tracks and two low-level platforms. The station building has a waiting room, bar and toilets. A commuter car park is adjacent to the station.

The Meran Hippodrome is located near the station.

History

From 1906 to 1950, the  had a stop and crossed the railway line near the station.

Services
The typical workday timetable is:

2 tph (train per hour) to Merano/Meran
2 tph to Bolzano/Bozen, one of which continues to Brennero/Brenner

References

Railway stations in South Tyrol
Merano